The Philippines competed in the Summer Olympic Games for the first time at the 1924 Summer Olympics in Paris, France.

Athletics

A single athlete represented the Philippines in 1924. It was the nation's debut appearance in the sport as well as the Games.

Ranks given are within the heat.

References

External links
Philippine Sports Commission
Official Olympic Reports

Nations at the 1924 Summer Olympics
1924 Summer Olympics
Summer Olympics